The Way of a Woman is a 1919 silent film drama directed by Robert Z. Leonard and starring Norma Talmadge. Talmadge produced and the film was distributed by Select Pictures.

Cast
Norma Talmadge - Nancy Lee
Conway Tearle - Anthony Weir
Gertrude Berkeley - Mrs. Lee
Frank DeVernon - Mr. Lee (*Colonel Vernon)
May McAvoy - Grace Lee
Jobyna Howland - Mollie Wise
Hassard Short - Johnnie Flinch
George Le Guere - Douglas Weir
Stuart Holmes - George Trevor
William Humphrey - Nathan Caspar (*aka William J. Humphrey)

Preservation status
A print is held at BFI National Film and Television Archive.

References

External links
 The Way of a Woman at IMDb.com

 lantern slide(State University of New York, SUNY)

1919 films
American silent feature films
American black-and-white films
Films directed by Robert Z. Leonard
Silent American drama films
1919 drama films
1910s American films